CD Baby, Inc. is an online distributor of independent music. The company was described as an "anti-label" by its parent company's Chief Operating Officer Tracy Maddux. The CD Baby music store was shut down in March 2020 with a statement that "CD Baby retired our music store in March of 2020 in order to place our focus entirely on the tools and services that are most meaningful to musicians today and tomorrow."

In 2019, CD Baby was the only digital aggregator with top preferred partner status with both Spotify and Apple Music, and it was home to more than 650,000 artists and nine million tracks that were made available to over 100 digital services and platforms around the globe as of May 2019.

The firm, as of 2018, operated out of Portland, Oregon, with offices in New York City and London.

History
CD Baby was founded in 1998 by Derek Sivers during the dot-com craze.

In 2000, the firm moved to Portland, Oregon, where they remain headquartered today. In 2004, CD Baby began offering a digital music distribution and became an early partner of iTunes.

In August 2008 Disc Makers, a CD and DVD manufacturer, announced that they had bought CD Baby (and Host Baby) for 22 million dollars following a 7-year partnership between the two companies.

In 2013, CD Baby Pro Publishing was launched as an add-on that assists independent songwriters in administering their composition rights and collecting global publishing royalties. The service is now available to songwriters in more than 70 countries and territories.

In March 2019, Disc Makers sold CD Baby (as part of the AVL Digital Group) to Downtown for $200 million. AVL's physical product divisions, Disc Makers, BookBaby, and Merchly, were acquired in a separate transaction by the Disc Makers executive team as part of the newly formed DIY Media Group.

On March 31, 2020, CD Baby ceased its retail sales.

Services
The company also hosts two annual conferences for independent musicians looking for education, networking, and performance opportunities. Described as "the only music conference geared specifically towards the needs of independent artists in charge of their careers", the DIY Musician Conference took place in Chicago in 2015 and 2016, Nashville in 2017 and 2018, and is scheduled in Austin for 2019 and 2020.

In 2018, CD Baby paid over $100 million to its artist community (a 25% increase from 2017), bringing its total artist payouts to over $700 million. In addition to the services the firm offers under its own name, CD Baby also now owns and operates HearNow, Show.co, Illustrated Sound Network, and HostBaby. HostBaby closed in 2019.

See also
List of companies based in Oregon
ONErpm

References

External links

1998 establishments in New York (state)
American companies established in 1998
Companies based in Portland, Oregon
Online music stores of the United States
Digital audio distributors